Godelieve Brys (born 24 April 1937) is a Belgian gymnast. She competed in five events at the 1960 Summer Olympics.

References

1937 births
Living people
Belgian female artistic gymnasts
Olympic gymnasts of Belgium
Gymnasts at the 1960 Summer Olympics
Sportspeople from Aalst, Belgium